is a railway station on the Takayama Main Line in the city of Gero,  Gifu Prefecture, Japan, operated by Central Japan Railway Company (JR Central).

Lines

Station layout
Hida-Kanayama Station has one ground-level island platform and one ground-level side platform connected by a footbridge. The station is staffed.

Platforms

Adjacent stations

History
Hida-Kanayama Station opened on March 21, 1928. The station was absorbed into the JR Central network upon the privatization of Japanese National Railways (JNR) on April 1, 1987.

Passenger statistics
In fiscal 2016, the station was used by an average of 209 passengers daily (boarding passengers only).

Surrounding area

See also
 List of Railway Stations in Japan

References

Railway stations in Gifu Prefecture
Takayama Main Line
Railway stations in Japan opened in 1928
Stations of Central Japan Railway Company